Verkhnekhozyatovo (Ürge Xäjät) is a rural locality (a village) in Shingak-Kulsky Selsoviet, Chishminsky District, Bashkortostan, Russia. The population was 91 as of 2010. There is 1 street.

Geography 
Verkhnekhozyatovo is located 21 km southwest of Chishmy (the district's administrative centre) by road. Durasovo is the nearest rural locality.

References 

Rural localities in Chishminsky District